The white metals are a series of often decorative bright metal alloys used as a base for plated silverware, ornaments or novelties, as well as any of several lead-based or tin-based alloys used for things like bearings, jewellery, miniature figures, fusible plugs, some medals and metal type.  The term is also used in the antiques trade for an item suspected of being silver, but not hallmarked.

A white metal alloy may include antimony, tin, lead, cadmium, bismuth, and  zinc (some of which are quite toxic). Not all of these metals are found in all white metal alloys. Metals are mixed to achieve a desired goal or need.

Silver
In compliance with British law, the British fine art trade uses the term "white metal" in auction catalogues to describe foreign silver items which do not carry British Assay Office hallmarks, but which are nonetheless understood to be silver and are priced accordingly.

Tin-lead and tin-copper alloys

Tin-lead and tin-copper alloys such as Babbitt metal have a low melting point, which is ideal for use as solder, but these alloys also have ideal characteristics for plain bearings. Most importantly for bearings, the material should be hard and wear-resistant and have a low coefficient of friction. It must also be shock-resistant, tough and sufficiently ductile to allow for slight misalignment prior to running-in.

Pure metals are soft, tough and ductile with a high coefficient of friction. Intermetallic compounds are hard and wear-resistant but brittle. By themselves, these do not make ideal bearing materials.

Alloys consist of small particles of a hard compound embedded in the tough, ductile background of a solid solution. In service the latter can wear away slightly, leaving the hard compound to carry the load. This wear also provides channels to allow in lubricant (oils).  All bearing metals contain antimony (Sb), which forms hard cubic crystals.

See also

 Britannia metal
 Nickel silver
 Pewter
 Pot metal
 Punchcutting
 Spelter
 Wood's metal
 Zamak

References

Alloys
Bearings (mechanical)